Three ships of the United States Navy have borne the name USS Paul Hamilton, named in honor of Paul Hamilton, (1762–1819), a veteran of the American War of Independence and the third Secretary of the Navy.

 The second, was a  destroyer, launched in 1943 and struck in 1968.
 The third, is an  destroyer, launched in 1993.

See also
 , a Liberty ship

United States Navy ship names